New Generation Mobile (NGM) is an Italian manufacturer of mobile phones, founded in 2003 by Stefano Nesi and Sergio Pancanti.

Sponsorship
NGM sponsors the football clubs Bologna F.C. 1909, and Empoli F.C.; during the 2013-2014 season it was main sponsor of the Serie B league. Its logo appeared on the jerseys of all players.

References

Italian brands
Mobile phone manufacturers
Electronics companies of Italy